Colonial period of the Philippines may refer to:

 History of the Philippines (1565–1898) (Spanish colonial period)
 History of the Philippines (1898–1946) (American colonial period)